The 167th (Canadien-Français) Battalion, CEF was a unit in the Canadian Expeditionary Force during the First World War.  Headquartered in Quebec City, Quebec, the unit began recruiting during the winter of 1915/16.  The unit never sailed for England and on January 15, 1917, became the Quebec Recruiting Depot.  The 167th (Canadien-Francais) Battalion, CEF had one Officer Commanding: Lieut-Col. O. Readman.

See also
 206th (Canadien-Français) Battalion, CEF

References
Meek, John F. Over the Top! The Canadian Infantry in the First World War. Orangeville, Ont.: The Author, 1971.

Battalions of the Canadian Expeditionary Force
Organizations based in Quebec City